The Weekly Democratic Address was delivered by a different prominent Democrat each week, in response to the Weekly Address of the President of the United States during a Republican presidency. When a Democrat has held the Presidency, the President delivers the weekly address, such as occurred during 2009-2017 under Barack Obama.

George W. Bush

2001 Weekly Democratic Address speakers
Republican President George W. Bush was inaugurated on January 20. While Democrats held a majority in the Senate until Inauguration Day, Republicans received a majority of seats in both the House and Senate following the inauguration.

2002 Weekly Democratic Address speakers

2003 Weekly Democratic Address speakers

2004 Weekly Democratic Address speakers

2005 Weekly Democratic Address speakers

2006 Weekly Democratic Address speakers

2007 Weekly Democratic Address speakers

2008 Weekly Democratic Address speakers
Democratic Nominee Barack Obama was elected president while the Democrats hold majorities in Both Houses. After the Election, Barack Obama gives out weekly addresses on the behalf of all Democrats.

2009 Weekly Democratic Address speakers
When Barack Obama was inaugurated as President, Democrats returned to having Weekly Addresses by the President while Republicans began the use of Weekly Responses. Democrats would later return to the Weekly Address format on January 21, 2017 with the inauguration of Donald Trump.

Donald Trump

2017 Weekly Democratic Address speakers
Republican President Donald Trump was inaugurated on January 20, and Republicans currently hold majorities in both houses of Congress. For the first time, the Democrats, as the Opposition, will begin and continue using video addresses in addition to its usual Radio Address that the Democrats made in the Bush Administration. The Republicans also did weekly video addresses during the Obama Administration.

2018 Weekly Democratic Address speakers
President Trump discontinued his Weekly Addresses in August 2018, although the Democrats continued their weekly addresses since then.

2019 Weekly Democratic Address speakers 
As of July 2019, President Trump has not issued a weekly address.

2020

2021
It was discontinued upon Trump’s loss of re-election to Joe Biden in the 2020 Election

See also

Weekly Republican Address - Republican Counterpart during a Democratic Presidency
Weekly Radio Address of the President of the United States

References

External links
 2003 Weekly Democratic Radio Addresses on C-SPAN (from April 19 to December 27)
 2004 Weekly Democratic Radio Addresses on C-SPAN (from January 3 to December 25)
 2005 Weekly Democratic Radio Addresses on C-SPAN (from January 8 to December 31)
 2006 Weekly Democratic Radio Addresses on C-SPAN (from January 7 to December 30)
 2007 Weekly Democratic Radio Addresses on C-SPAN (from January 6 to December 29)

Democratic Party (United States)